

341001–341100 

|-bgcolor=#f2f2f2
| colspan=4 align=center | 
|}

341101–341200 

|-bgcolor=#f2f2f2
| colspan=4 align=center | 
|}

341201–341300 

|-bgcolor=#f2f2f2
| colspan=4 align=center | 
|}

341301–341400 

|-id=317
| 341317 Weisshaidinger || 2007 TE || Lukas Weisshaidinger (born 1992) is an Austrian discus thrower and shot putter. He won the bronze medal for discus at both the 2018 European Championship and 2019 World Championship. || 
|-id=359
| 341359 Gregneumann ||  || Gregory A. Neumann (born 1947), an American planetary scientist involved NASA's  MGS, LRO, GRAIL and MESSENGER missions || 
|}

341401–341500 

|-bgcolor=#f2f2f2
| colspan=4 align=center | 
|}

341501–341600 

|-id=520
| 341520 Mors-Somnus ||  || Mors and Somnus, the twin gods of the underworld and offspring of Nox in Roman mythology || 
|}

341601–341700 

|-bgcolor=#f2f2f2
| colspan=4 align=center | 
|}

341701–341800 

|-bgcolor=#f2f2f2
| colspan=4 align=center | 
|}

341801–341900 

|-id=826
| 341826 Aurelbaier ||  || Aurel Baier (born 1980) has studied informatics and is currently developing and maintaining various software systems. In his leisure time he promotes astronomy to the public. He is a member of the committee of the Observatory of Ependes and each year organizes a public event for Astronomy Day in Switzerland. || 
|}

341901–342000 

|-id=958
| 341958 Chrétien ||  || Henri Chrétien (1879–1956), a French astronomer and optician. || 
|-id=000
| 342000 Neumünster ||  || The German city of Neumünster, Schleswig-Holstein, has supported astronomical education since 1969. Currently they operate an observatory that offers astronomical courses and public observing. The observatory focuses on education. || 
|}

References 

341001-342000